Spring Banke is a historic home located near Clarksville, Sussex County, Delaware. It was built in two sections, both of oak and gum frame construction.  The earlier section is  stories, with one room on each floor.  The later section is two-stories, and has cypress siding.  It is a rare example of an 18th-century, small house of a type that was occupied by tenants, small farmers, and other colonists of limited means.

It was added to the National Register of Historic Places in 1976.

References

Houses on the National Register of Historic Places in Delaware
Houses in Sussex County, Delaware
National Register of Historic Places in Sussex County, Delaware